The Philippine Navy is expecting the delivery of two new corvettes acquired under its Corvette Acquisition Project under the Revised AFP Modernization Program's Horizon 2 phase covering years 2018 to 2022.

The Philippines' Department of National Defense (DND) signed a contract with South Korean shipbuilder Hyundai Heavy Industries on 28 December 2021, with the shipbuilder delivering a variant of their HDC-3100 / HDF-3100 corvette/frigate design.

The ships are not yet named, and construction is expected to start by 2022.

Development

Concept Design
The Philippine Navy included plans to procure 2 new guided missile corvettes as part of its Horizon 2 modernization phase, with the proposal with a budget of PHP28 billion (US$550 million) among those approved in-principle by Philippine President Rodrigo Duterte in June 2018.

During the pre-procurement development phase, the Technical Working Group (TWG) assigned for the project has used the Philippine Navy's latest warship, the Jose Rizal-class frigate as baseline for the new corvettes, while improvements will be added based on lessons learned from the said frigate's development and construction from 2016 to 2020.

Based on open source information, the new corvette would be more or less similar in size to the Jose Rizal-class frigate, but will have improved sensors and weapons suit.

Sensors were believed to include the following:
 an improved combat management system (CMS) compared to the one installed on the Jose Rizal-class frigate;
 an AESA 3D air/surface search radar system, an improvement over the non-AESA system on the Jose Rizal-class frigate;
 a secondary surface search/navigation radar system;
 a fire control radar (FCR);
 an electro-optical tracking system (EOTS);
 a radar electronic support measures (R-ESM) system;
 a hull mounted sonar (HMS);
 a towed array sonar (TAS) which would be included upon delivery, compared to being a "fitted for but not with" (FFBNW) subsystem on the Jose Rizal-class frigate;

Weapon systems will include the following:
 an Oto Melara 76mm Super Rapid naval gun, carried over for commonality with other existing ships;
 one or two 30mm secondary naval guns, either the Aselsan SMASH, MSI Defence DS30, Rafael Typhoon, or BAE Systems Mk.38 Mk.3, all of which are already in service with the Philippine Navy;
 a gun-based close-in weapon system (CIWS);
 at least four manually-operated 12.7mm heavy machine guns;
 two quadruple missile launchers for medium-range anti-ship missiles;
 a 16-cell vertical launching system (VLS) for short-medium range surface-to-air missiles;
 two triple lightweight anti-submarine torpedo launchers

The project was divided into two lots. Lot 1 was allocated PHP25 billion for the procurement of the corvette and weapon systems, and Lot 2 with a budget of PHP3 billion for the procurement of the ships' munitions.

Selection
Several offers were made to the Philippine Navy to meet the requirements for new corvettes, including proposals coming from South Korea's Hyundai Heavy Industries, Turkey's ASFAT, Israel Shipyards, Germany's ThyssenKrupp Marine Systems (TKMS), France's Naval Group, Dutch shipbuilder Damen Group, and India's Goa Shipyard.

The Department of National Defense eventually decided for the project to be procured under negotiated process, and undertaken through Government-to-Government (G2G) process, which means a support and participation of the government of the shipbuilder's country of origin.

By 2021, South Korea's Hyundai Heavy Industries and Turkey's ASFAT were shortlisted for the project. HHI offered their HDC-3100 corvette design. On the other hand, ASFAT offered a revised version of their Ada-class corvette.

Ultimately, Hyundai Heavy Industries was selected as the winning contractor for the project's Lot 1, with a Notice of Award released by the DND on 15 December 2021, and a contract signed on 28 December 2021.

HHI HDC-3100 design

Hyundai Heavy Industries' HDC-3100 corvette design, also known as the HDF-3100 frigate design, will become the benchmark design for the Philippine Navy's future frigate. It is an improved design of the HDF-2600 which was used on the Jose Rizal-class frigate, with a longer hull to accommodate increased subsystem requirements of the Philippine Navy.

The benchmark HDC-3100 has a length of 116 meters, a breadth of 14.8 meters, and a displacement of 3,100 tons, and will have a Combined Diesel and Diesel (CODAD) propulsion configuration allowing a maximum speed in excess of 25 knots and a range of up to 4,500 nautical miles.

It has space for a 76mm primary naval gun in A-position, a 16-cell VLS (with space for 16 more) behind the primary naval gun, torpedo launchers on both port and starboard sides, and a gun-based close-in weapon system above the helicopter hangar. Aside from the CIWS, there is no more small-calibre secondary gun as previously expected.

The space for the vertical launching system has been lengthened to accommodate a 16-cell system, and helicopter landing deck also appears to have been lengthened to allow longer helicopter designs.

Confirmed subsystems

South Korean defense company Hanwha Systems has secured a contract to supply the new corvette's combat management system (CMS). It was confirmed to be the Naval Shield Integrated Combat Management System Baseline 4.

UK-based defense company SEA has been contracted by Hyundai Heavy Industries to supply the torpedo launching systems for the new corvettes, with SEA delivering two of their TLS systems to each of the corvettes. The SEA TLS can be used to launch a variety of torpedo models including the US Mark 44, Mark 46 and Mark 54 torpedoes, the UK Sting Ray, the Italian A244-S, French MU90 Impact, and the South Korean K745 Blue Shark torpedoes.

Israel Aerospace Industries (IAI) Elta Systems was awarded a contract to supply the new corvettes with their ELM-2258 Advanced Lightweight Phased Array (ALPHA) 3D active electronically scanned array (AESA) air/surface search radar system. The ELM-2258 ALPHA can provide 360° radar coverage, and can track low-flying targets within a range of 25 kilometers and high-flying ones within a range of 250 kilometers in complex environments.

Ships in class

See also
 List of equipment of the Philippine Navy

References 

Ships built by Hyundai Heavy Industries Group
Corvettes of the Philippine Navy